William Allen Butler (February 20, 1825 – September 9, 1902) was an American lawyer and writer of poetical satires.

Early life
Butler was born on February 20, 1825, in Albany, New York. He was the son of the poet and lawyer Benjamin Franklin Butler and his wife Harriet Allen and, via his mother, the nephew of naval hero William Howard Allen. Butler graduated from the University of the City of New York in 1843 and became a New York lawyer.

Career
After being admitted to the bar, Butler practiced law and eventually headed the firm of Butler, Stillman & Hubbard. He served as president of the American Bar Association and the Association of the Bar of the City of New York.

He contributed travel writing and comic writing to The Literary World, a series on 'The Cities of Art and the Early Artists' to the Art Union Bulletin and also wrote for the Democratic Review. His most famous satirical poem, Nothing to Wear, was first published anonymously in Harper's Weekly in 1857 (see 1857 in poetry), though Butler was forced to reveal his name after someone else claimed authorship.

Personal life
On March 21, 1850, he married Mary R. Marshall. Together, they were the parents of Howard Russell Butler, a painter and founder of the American Fine Arts Society, who was born in 1856. One of his daughters married John P. Crosby, another married Daniel B. Lord. His other children included Benjamin Franklin Butler, Jr., Mrs. Edmund Dwight, Mrs. Thomas S. Kirkbride, and Mrs.
Alfred Booth. Butler also wrote various poems, including “Nothing to Wear; an Episode of City Life,” which became an American classic.

Butler died at his residence, Round Oak, in Palisade Avenue in Yonkers, on September 9, 1902, due to sudden gastritis. Following a simple ceremony at his estate in Yonkers, a service was held at the First Presbyterian Church of Yonkers, and he was buried at Woodlawn Cemetery, Bronx.

References

External links
 
 
 
 
 

1825 births
1902 deaths
New York (state) lawyers
19th-century American writers
Presidents of the New York City Bar Association
New York University alumni
19th-century American male writers
Presidents of the American Bar Association